Alexei Eremenko is a transliteration of a Slavic name. Alternatives for the given name are Aleksey, Aleksei and Alexey and for the last name are Yeryomenko, Eryomenko or Yeremenko. It may refer to:
Alexei Eremenko (born 1983), Russian-Finnish association football player
Aleksei Borisovich Yeryomenko (born 1964), Russian-Finnish association football player, father of Alexei Eremenko
Aleksei Gordeyevich Yeryomenko (1906–1942), Soviet military officer pictured in a famous World War II photograph